Bright is a company producing 3D, immersive, playful contents and experiences owned by Abdel Bounane. It transforms complex informations in playful, immersive experiences like 3D infographics, experiential websites, videogames. For Abdel Bounane, "those creations have the potential to show complex topics in an easier, graspable manner".

Origins 
Bright first provided video, data and interactive artworks subscriptions for brands, software and apps, connected places and smart cities.

It has been noticed by European newspapers as the first to provide a business model for digital art

References

External links

 L'art numérique s'ouvre au grand public, at Challenge(s)
 L'art numérique sert l'image des marques, at Les Echos
 La playlist d'art numérique, at Strategies
 La plateforme d'art numérique, at CB News
 Une révolution pour le monde de l'art, at Bilan
 Bright, un business model pour l'art numérique, at The Good Life
 Bright, la plateforme d'art numérique, at ETAPES
 Data-Artiste, at L'ADN
 L'oeuvre à l'ère de sa reproduction numérique, at France Culture
 Les startups qui innovent dans le domaine de l'art, at Frenchweb
 Une révolution pour le monde de l'art, at BFM

Technology companies established in 2014
Companies based in Paris